The Hochficht is a mountain on the border between Austria and the Czech Republic with an elevation of . It is situated in the Bohemian Forest mountain range.

The Austrian side belongs to the Klaffer am Hochficht municipality and there is a rock outcrop with a summit cross, a ski lift station and a weather station. The Czech side belongs to the Horní Planá municipality and is in the core zone of the Šumava National Park.

Winter sports area 
The Hochficht is also a winter sports area, which covers the three adjacent mountain of Zwieselberg, Reischlberg and Hochficht, and is open annually to the end of March or early April (usually until Easter). The start of the ski season here depends on the weather. There are 8 pistes with a total length of around 20 km and a ski route. They are served by 2 drag lifts and three 4-seater chair lifts (Hochfichtbahn since 1994, Schwarzenbergbahn since 2001, Zwieselbergbahn since 2004) Since 2017 the 10-seater, 2-leg gondola lift, the Reischlbergbahn, has transported skiers up the Reischlberg. The longest ski run is the Stierwiesen run from the Hochficht, the second longest is the FIS run, on which Europacup races take place. At the Zwieselberg there is also a FIS slalom run, where Europacup races also take place. The majority of pistes (55%) are rated as easy. The valley station is at 800 m. Six langlauf routes, three of which are free, with a total length of around 165 km complete the winter sports facilities.

Hiking 
In summer all the lifts are closed and there is only a small café open. Several hiking trails, including the Nordwaldkammweg from the tripoint to the Waldviertel, run over the summit; in addition there are viewing points at Stinglfelsen and Schönbergfelsen.

External links 

 Website of the Hochficht ski lifts

References 

One-thousanders of Austria
Mountains and hills of the Czech Republic
Mountains of Upper Austria
Bohemian Forest
Ski areas in Austria
One-thousanders of the Czech Republic